OneTaste is a business which was primarily dedicated to teaching the practices of orgasmic meditation (OM) and slow sex. Though it embraced ideas based in Eastern philosophy, the central focus was a meditation practice around the sensation of a man touching a woman's genitalia. It was founded by Nicole Daedone in San Francisco. The company started to receive more widespread attention around 2007.

As OneTaste grew and received more media attention, the organization was accused of cult-like operations, similar to Lafayette Morehouse, an intentional community which influenced Daedone. An  exposé by Bloomberg in 2018 led to OneTaste being investigated by the FBI for sex trafficking, prostitution, and violations of labor law. Shortly thereafter, OneTaste closed all of their U.S. locations and stopped hosting in-person classes.

Orgasmic meditation 
The community is centered around a practice known as Orgasmic Meditation (OM), which is a mindfulness practice in which the object of meditation is finger-to-genital contact, specifically stimulation of the female clitoris. OM is practiced in pairs, with one practitioner stroking the female's genitals, while both focus their attention on the sensation with the stated goal of developing "connective resonance" between pairs. Daedone described her own work as "one that places a near-exclusive emphasis on women's pleasure — in which love, romance and even flirtation are not required." After, both partners discuss their experiences verbally. Orgasmic Meditation borrows from other traditions including yoga and meditation.

Proponents state that orgasmic meditation encompasses more than just orgasm and that it encourages greater emotional awareness, connected relationships, and sense of fulfillment. Others describe the sensation as "a heady buzz, mixed with equal parts wooziness and intensity of focus." Practitioners of orgasmic meditation claim the practice nourishes the limbic system, the area of the mammalian brain responsible for emotion, empathy, and motivation but these claims are unsubstantiated by any source outside their organization.

History 

OneTaste was cofounded in San Francisco by Robert Kandell and Nicole Daedone. Daedone stated that a "Buddhist monk" introduced her to orgasmic meditation before she started OneTaste, though she did not name the monk nor the lineage the monk studied under.

OneTaste originally operated two communal-style "urban retreat" centers, one in San Francisco's Soma District and another in Lower Manhattan. OneTaste then expanded to Los Angeles and London. The company produced media, workshops, weekend retreats, and a coach training program. In 2014, OneTaste was listed as an Inc. 5000 fastest growing company.  In 2018, OneTaste closed all of their U.S. locations and stopped hosting in person classes.

After the FBI investigation, some people in OneTaste have rebranded and refocused, and are operating as The Institute of OM.

Another organization, the Unconditional Freedom Project, is not linked legally in any way to OneTaste, yet shares "key personnel, a website, and a mailing address". This latter organization runs a ministry that operates in some California jails. The Unconditional Freedom Project, the group’s quasi-Buddhist prison ministry that aims to “turn prisons into monasteries,” currently does ministry at the Mendocino County Jail in Ukiah and the Central California Women’s Facility, according to emails sent to and from the prisons. According to their website, members of the Unconditional Freedom Project correspond with inmates via mail and provide them with spiritual guidance as outlined in two books from the organization that appear to be written by Daedone.

Mission statement 
The organization's stated goal is "to create a clean, well-lit place where sexuality, relationship, and intimacy could be discussed openly and honestly."  Daedone draws parallels between slow sex and the Slow Food movement associated with chef Alice Waters. With sex as with food, she says, people can overindulge without getting nourishment, or go from one extreme of consuming mindlessly to the other extreme of self-denial.

Controversy 
OneTaste drew international media attention, controversy, and then an FBI investigation.

Several journalists have compared OneTaste to a cult and pyramid scheme. "As with many a commune before it, the leader of One Taste, Ms. Daedone, is a polarizing personality, whom admirers venerate as a sex diva, although some former members say she has cult like powers over her followers... Much of the community’s tone revolves around Ms. Daedone, a woman of considerable charm, although detractors regard her as a master manipulator." In a New York Times interview, Ms. Daedone insists she does not aspire to guru status, while acknowledging that "there’s a high potential for this to be a cult."

A New York Times article led to several critical blog and opinion columns. A 2013 Gawker article referenced online cult accusations, which documented the reporter's experience at a weekend conference hosted by OneTaste. An article in GoodTimes Weekly, 'The Big OM', refers to "cult allegations" by posters on Yelp.com, as did one on Vice and on Salon. A 2016 episode of the podcast Love + Radio is dedicated to the experience of a woman who had increasingly fraught relations with OneTaste. An article in The Cut stated that "some cult experts have linked Daedone with Victor Baranco," the cult leader who ran Lafayette Morehouse, and also suggest that it may be a pyramid scheme. Similarly, an article in The Frisky described OneTaste as "Landmark Forum for the clitoris." A Refinery 29 article cited the organization's "potentially aggressive sales tactics." Playboy Magazine compared OneTaste to Scientology and Landmark Forum, saying it had a "pyramidal pricing structure". For example, a week-long training with Nicole Daedone was advertised at $36,000. Daedone was quoted "All I can think about is how easy it is to start a cult. .... the way the volunteers serve the leaders, jumping at their every demand to "get me water” and “move that stool”... the full-court sales pitch from the minute you walk in... I leave early and I'm furious". The author implies she was gaslighted when she disagreed with the leaders. She writes that she was re-traumatized "for weeks" as memories of her past sexual trauma were triggered by a business promising female empowerment but "people probably just want your money."

The book Sensation by Isabel Losada ends with a "Warning" about "'hard sell" techniques... 'One Taste' (like many businesses) offer a wide range of courses which are outside the price range of most bank accounts. I'll say it again. Please don't spend money that you don't have."

In 2015, a former employee received a 6-figure settlement for sexual assault and harassment. Around universities, students are drawn to free OneTaste events with ad boards such as "Tired of Swiping Left? Let’s Talk Real Intimacy!" or "You Do Yoga. You Meditate. Now try #OrgasmicMeditation". A year-long, $60,000 premium membership is sold by the company since 2014. OneTaste teaches their members that money is just an emotional obstacle, which led some of them down to thousands of dollars in credit card debts. In June 2018, Bloomberg Businessweek published an article chronicling recent training changes and that was critical of how the company treated its employees and consultants, often pressuring them to take expensive courses, programs, and retreats that drove them into debt. Former members of the organization testifying about their experience at OneTaste said it "resembled a kind of prostitution ring", where managers frequently ordered staffers to engage in sexual relations with customers. 

After the Bloomberg article, the Federal Bureau of Investigation opened a probe into OneTaste for prostitution, sex trafficking, and violations of labor law.

In November 2020, BBC Radio 4 released a 10-part investigative podcast entitled The Orgasm Cult that spoke to former workers of the company, detailing allegations of emotional, financial and sexual abuse, with some saying that OneTaste’s teachings and practices gaslit many women, leaving them with symptoms of PTSD. The podcast also spoke to experts about how the medical establishment’s dismissal of women’s health concerns pushes many women towards the growing and unregulated wellness industry and companies like OneTaste.

Documentary
A Netflix documentary film, Orgasm Inc: The Story of OneTaste, was released on November 5, 2022. Prior to the release, several people formerly associated with OneTaste filed a lawsuit, seeking a temporary restraining order and the removal of certain sexually explicit imagery. Their request was denied.

See also
 Pyramid Scheme
 Sex cult
 Sex-positive movement
 Tantric sex

References

Further reading

External links

 
 Orgasmic Meditators: Vice Documentary on OneTaste

Human sexuality organizations
Slow movement
Cults